A Different Me Tour was the first headlining concert tour by American singer Keyshia Cole in support to her third studio album A Different Me. The tour visited North America. Her supporting acts for the tour were The-Dream, Keri Hilson, and Bobby Valentino.

Background
During an interview Cole stated:  ""The most gratifying thing for me in show business is having the ability to be intimate with my fans. Singing directly to them is the most intimate thing I can do,"

Setlist
Bobby Valentino
"(Intro)"
"Tell Me"
"Anonymous"
"Slow Down"
"Hands On Me"
"Those Jeans"
"Beep (w/ Yung Joc at some shows)"

Keri Hilson
"(Intro)"
"Knock You Down"
"The Way I Are"
"Slow Dance"
"Intuition"
"Energy"
"(Songs Keri wrote & loves)"
"Runaway Love/ Take Me As I Am/ Weak/ Baby, Baby, Baby/ Rock The Boat"
"How Does It Feel"
"Get Your Money Up"
"Turnin Me On"

The Dream
"(Intro)"
"Fast Car"
"Nikki/Dirty Diana (Michael Jackson cover)"
"Ditch That....."
"Walkin On The Moon..."
"Shawty Is The Sh..."
"My Love"
"Purple Kisses"
"I Love Your Girl"
"Love Vs. Money"
"Falsetto"
"Rockin That Sh..."

Keyshia Cole
Set 1:
"(Photo Collage Video Introduction)"
"I Changed My Mind"
"Oh-Oh, Yea Yea"
"I Should Have Cheated"
"Give Me More"
"I Remember"

Set 2:
"Let It Go"
"Didnt I Tell You"
"Gotta Get My Heart Back"
"Shoulda Let You Go"
"Get Money (Amina solo)"
"Last Night"
"Heaven Sent"
"Love"
"Background Singers Medley (Sweet Thing/Ain't Nobody)"

Set 3:
(A Different Me Video Introduction)
"Please Dont Stop"
"You Complete Me"
"Trust (w/ Monica at select dates)"
"Playa Cardz Right"
"Make Me Over"

Opening acts
 The-Dream 
 Keri Hilson 
 Bobby Valentino
 Monica (special guest)
 Lil' Kim, Too Short, T-Boz & Chilli of TLC (special guests for Oakland show)

Tour dates

Reschedules and cancellations
The June 12 show was rescheduled to June 15 because of a storm in Southaven causing the DeSoto Civic Center to not have any power.

References 

2009 concert tours